Barry Stephen Grint (born April 1959) is an English mastering engineer and member of the mastering group of the Music Producers Guild (MPG).  Grint has worked on over 20 UK Number One records and more than 100 UK Top Ten hits.  Projects for artists include: Madonna, Prince, Puff Daddy, Eric Clapton, David Bowie, The Beatles, Oasis, Keane, Beach Boys, Jessie J, Rod Stewart, Paul Simon, Van Halen, Michael McDonald and A-ha.

He began cutting records at Trident Studios in 1984 mastering international tracks for the UK and Europe. He identified his work by etching Bazza in the run out groove and of the years various incarnations have included Bazza @ Audio One, Bazza @ Tape One, Bazza @ Porky's, Bazza @ Abbey Road and Bazza @ Alchemy. He is now mastering and cutting vinyl at Alchemy's studios in Brook Green, London.

Representing the Music Producers Guild, Grint worked with the European Broadcasting Union (EBU) to create a standard for embedding the International Standard Recording Code (ISRC) within a Broadcast Wave Format (BWF). This has been adopted by the main manufacturers of mastering software internationally and is supported by The International Federation of the Phonographic Industry (IFPI), the British Phonographic Industry (BPI) and the Association of Independent Music (AIM).

Selected discography

1980s

1984: Alphaville;- Big In Japan
1984: Boothill Foot-tappers- Get Your Feet Out Of My Shoes
1984: Break Machine;- Street Dance
1984: Break Machine;- Breakdance Party
1984: Chicago;- Hard Habit to Break
1984: Duran Duran;- The Wild Boys
1984: Foreigner;- I Want To Know What Love Is
1984: Madonna;- Like a Virgin
1984: Van Halen;- Jump
1984: ZZ Top;- Gimme All Your Lovin'
1984: ZZ Top;- Sharp Dressed Man

1985: A-HA;- Take On Me
1985: A-HA;- The Sun Always Shines On TV
1985: Animotion;- Obsession
1985: Steve Arrington;- Feel So Real
1985: Steve Arrington;- Dancin' In The Key Of Life
1985: The Cars;- Drive
1985: Commodores;- Nightshift
1985: Duran Duran;- View To A Kill
1985: Sheila E;- The Belle Of St Mark
1985: Foreigner;- Cold As Ice (Rmx)
1985: Doug E. Fresh & The Get Fresh Crew;- The Show
1985: James Ingram;- Yah Mo Be There
1985: Kool And The Gang;- Cherish
1985: Huey Lewis And The News;- The Power Of Love
1985: Huey Lewis And The News;- Heart And Soul
1985: Michael McDonald;- Yah Mo Be There
1985: Madonna;- Material Girl
1985: Madonna;- Crazy For You
1985: Madonna;- Into The Groove
1985: Madonna;- Holiday
1985: Madonna;- Dress You Up
1985: John Parr;- St Elmo's Fire
1985: Prince;- 1999/Little Red Corvette
1985: Prince;- Raspberry Beret
1985: Simply Red;- Holding Back The Years
1985: Sister Sledge;- Frankie
1985: ZZ Top;- Legs

1986: A-HA;- Train Of Thought
1986: A-HA;- Hunting High And Low
1986: A-HA;- Cry Wolf
1986: Bon Jovi;- You Give Love A Bad Name
1986: Bon Jovi;- Livin' On A Prayer
1986: Cameo;- Word Up
1986: Peter Cetera;- Glory Of Love
1986: Europe;- The Final Countdown
1986: Farley "Jackmaster" Funk;- Love Can't Turn Around
1986: Hollywood Beyond;- ''1986: Hollywood Beyond;- No More Tears1986: Anita Baker;- Sweet Love1986: Bananarama;- Venus1986: Huey Lewis And The News;- The Power Of Love / Do You Believe In Love1986: Huey Lewis And The News;- The Heart Of Rock And Roll1986: Huey Lewis And The News;- Stuck With You1986: Huey Lewis And The News;- Hip To Be Square1986: Michael McDonald;- On My Own1986: Michael McDonald;- I keep Forgettin1986: Michael McDonald;- Sweet Freedom1986: Madonna;- Borderline1986: Madonna;- Live To Tell1986: Madonna;- Papa Don't Preach1986: Madonna;- True Blue1986: Madonna;- Open Your Heart1986: Mel & Kim;- Showing Out (Get Fresh At The Weekend)1986: Nu Shooz;- I Can't Wait1986: Prince;- Kiss1986: Stan Ridgway;- Camouflage1986: Rochelle;- My Magic Man1986: Paul Simon;- You Can Call Me Al1986: Paul Simon;- Boy In The Bubble1986: Frank Sinatra;- New York, New York1986: Candi Staton;- Young Hearts Run Free1986: Status Quo; In The Army Now1986: Rod Stewart;- Every Beat Of My Heart1986: Rod Stewart;- Another Heartache1986: Swing Out Sister;- Break Out1986: Prince;- Mountains1986: Eric Clapton/Tina Turner;- Tearing Us Apart1987: A-HA;- The Living Daylights1987: Atlantic Starr;- Always1987: Beastie Boys;- Girls/She's Crafty1987: Bee Gees;- You Win Again1987: Eric Clapton;- Behind The Mask1987: Doobie Brothers;- What A Fool Believes1987: David Essex;- Myfanwy1987: John Farnham;- You're The Voice1987: Karel Fialka;- Hey Matthew1987: The Firm;- Star Trekkin'1987: Fleetwood Mac;- Big Love1987: Freeez;- Southern Freeze (Rmx)1987: Georgia Satellites;- Battleship Chains1987: Glenn & Chris;- Diamond Lights1987: Steve 'Silk' Hurley;- Jack Your Body1987: Anita Baker;- Caught Up In The rapture1987: Ben E. King;- Stand By Me1987: Michael McDonald;- What A Fool Believes1987: Madonna;- La Isla Bonita1987: Mel & Kim;- Respectable1987: Mel & Kim;- F.L.M.1987: Nitro Deluxe;- This Brutal House (Rmx)1987: Prince;- Sign O' The Times1987: Prince;- If I Was Your Girlfriend1987: Prince;- U Got The Look1987: R.E.M;- The One I Love1987: Cliff Richard;- Some People1987: Sinitta;- Toy Boy1987: Sinitta;- G.T.O.1987: Rod Stewart;- Sailing1987: Stock Aitken Waterman;- Roadblock1987: Timbuk 3;- The Future's So Bright, I Gotta Wear Shades1987: Sal Solo;- Adoramous Te1987: Full Force;- Love Is For Suckers1987: The Alarm;- Presence Of Love1988: A-HA;- Touchy1988: Beach Boys;- Kokomo1988: Beatmasters;- Rok da House1988: Bomb The Bass;- Beat Dis1988: Cookie Crew;- Rok da House1988: Guns N' Roses;- Sweet Child O' Mine1988: Simon Harris;- Bass (How Low Can You Go)1988: Heart;- Never / These Dreams1988: Derek B;- GoodGroove1988: Derek B;- Bad Young Brother1988: Derek B;- We've Got The Juice1988: INXS;- Never Tear Us Apart1988: Glen Medeiros;- Nothing's Gonna Change My Love For You1988: Milli Vanilli;- Girl You Know It's True1988: Milli Vanilli;- Baby Don't Forget My Number1988: Vanessa Paradis;- Joe le taxi1988: Michelle Shocked;- Anchorage1988: Sinitta;- Cross My Broken Heart1988: Yello;- The Race1988: Captain Sensible;- Savage Amusement1988: Siouxsie & The Banshees;- The Killing Jar1988: Siouxsie & The Banshees;- Peek A Boo1989: Double Trouble;- Just Keep Rockin1989: Double Trouble;- Street Tuff1989: A Guy Called Gerald;- Voodoo Ray1989: Debbie Harry;- I Want That Man1989: Chaka Khan;- I Feel For You (Rmx)1989: Tone Loc;- Wild Thing1989: Tone Loc;- Funky Cold Medina1989: Mike + The Mechanics;- The Living Years1989: Milli Vanilli;- Girl I'm Gonna Miss You1989: Pat & Mick;- I Haven't Stopped Dancing Yet1989: Paul Simpson;- Musical Freedom (Movin' On Up)1989: Sinitta;- Right Back Where We Started From1989: Sinitta;- Love On A Mountain Top1989: Steeleye Span;- Following Me1989: Black Sabbath;- Devil & Daughter1989: Toni Halliday;- Weekday1990s

1990 Beats International;- Dub Be Good To Me1990 The Farm;- All Together Now1990 Guru Josh;- Infinity1990 Roxette;- Dressed For Success1990 Sinitta;- Hitchin' A Ride1990 Sinitta;- Love And Affection1991 Marc Cohn;- Walking In Memphis1991 Chris Isaak;- Blue Hotel1991 Alison Limerick;- Where Love Lives1991 Brian May;- Driven By You1991 Robert Palmer;- Mercy Mercy Me1991 PM Dawn;- Set Adrift On Memory Bliss1991 Shamen;- Move Any Mountain1991 Gary Numan;- Heart1991 The Orb;- Perpetual Dawn1991 Chic;- Le Freak1992 Dr Alban;- It's My Life1992 Shakespears Sister;- Stay1992 Gary Numan;- Machine + Soul1993 Kate Bush;- Rubberband Girl1993 Chaka Demus & Pliers;- Tease Me1993 Eternal;- Stay1993 Tim Finn;- Hit The Ground Running1993 4 Non Blondes;- What's Up1993 Gloria Gaynor;- I Will Survive (Rmx)1993 Slade;- Radio Wall Of Sound1994 Ant & Dec;- Let's Get Ready To Rhumble1994 Alicia Bridges;- I Love The Nightlife (Rmx)1994 Phyllis Nelson;- Move Closer1994 Oasis;- Whatever1994 Reel 2 Real;- I Like To Move It1995 Ant & Dec;- Our Radio Rocks1995 Robson & Jerome;- Unchained Melody1995 Robson & Jerome;- I Believe / Up On The Roof1995 Oasis;- Some Might Say1995 Oasis;- Roll With It1996 Peter Andre;- Mysterious Girl1996 Paul Carrack;- Eyes Of Blue1996 Robert Miles;- Children1997 David Arnold;- Diamonds Are Forever1997 David Bowie;- Dead Man Walking1997 Hanson;- MMMBop1997 Natalie Imbruglia;- Torn1997 Ce Ce Peniston;- Finally1997 Detune;- Expression1997 Puff Daddy & The Family;- Been Around The World1998 BT;- Godspeed1998 B*Witched;- C'est La Vie1998 Digitalis;- The Third State1999 BT;- Mercury And Solace1999 Vengaboys;- We Like To Party1999 Freq Nasty;- Underglass2000s

2000 BT;- Dreaming2012 Keane;- The Starting Line2013 Jessie J;- Do It Like A Dude (Acoustic)2013 Wolf Alice;- Blush2013 Erasure;- The Remixes2013 Erasure;- Gaudete2013 Backstreet Boys;- In A World Like This2013 David Garret;- Bring Me To Life2014 Nicole Scherzinger;- On The Rocks2014 Nicole Scherzinger;- Run2014 Everything Everything;- Arc2014 The Vamps;- Cecilia2014 Erasure;- Reason2014 Erasure;- Be The One2014 Goldfrapp;- Blood Diamonds2014 Lindsay & Isaac;- Sad Song (Oasis Cover)2014 Beats Dr Dre;- Turn2014 Brad K;- The Risk2015 Everything Everything;- Distant Past2015 Amber Run;- I Found2015 The Strypes;- Flat Out EP2015 Slaves;- Cheer Up London2015 Erasure;- Sacred2015 Nothing But Thieves;- Itch2015 AllTwins;- Thank You2016 Tom Odell;- Wrong Crowd''
2016 Radiohead;- "A Moon Shaped Pool"
2016 Shadows & Mirrors;- "ARIA"
2017 Bosum;- "Marvin"
2017 Winters Hill;- "
2017 Anomic Soul;- "AS1"
2017 Gorillaz;- "Demon Days"

References

English audio engineers
Mastering engineers
1959 births
Living people